Saint Apollonia is a painting attributed to the Italian baroque painter Artemisia Gentileschi executed between 1642 and 1644. It is part of the collection of the Museo Soumaya in Mexico City, Mexico.

Description 
The painting depicts Saint Apollonia, a martyr who died in Alexandria  during an uprising against Christians in A.D. 249. The portrait shows the saint from the waist up, against a dark background, looking up, as if skyward. Her left hand extended upward, while her right hand is carrying a pair of tweezers with a tooth, an iconographic attribute that helps identify her as Apollonia.

The dress of Apollonia is mauve velvet with light blue sleeves that allow to appreciate the draping of the fabric. The sleeves and neck are adorned with pearls. An important aspect is the use of chiaroscuro, a pictorial technique typical of the baroque that helps make the picture more dramatic, in the style of Caravaggio.

The painting is believed to be painted in Naples, after her return from London in 1642, and was paired with picture of Saint Lucy.

Provenance
The painting was undocumented before it appeared for sale at Sotheby's London in 1980.

References

Sources

Baroque paintings
Paintings by Artemisia Gentileschi
1642 paintings
Paintings in the collection of the Museo Soumaya
Gentileschi